Pârvuleşti may refer to:

Pârvuleşti, a village in Mănăstirea Cașin Commune, Bacău County, Romania
Pârvuleşti, a village in Stăneşti Commune, Gorj County, Romania
Pârvuleşti, a village in Corcova Commune, Mehedinţi County, Romania